In mathematics, particularly in algebra, an indeterminate system is a system of simultaneous equations (e.g., linear equations) which has more than one solution (sometimes infinitely many solutions). In the case of a linear system, the system may be said to be underspecified, in which case the presence of more than one solution would imply an infinite number of solutions (since the system would be describable in terms of at least one free variable), but that property does not extend to nonlinear systems (e.g., the system with the equation ).

An indeterminate system by definition is consistent, in the sense of having at least one solution. For a system of linear equations, the number of equations in an indeterminate system could be the same as the number of unknowns, less than the number of unknowns (an underdetermined system), or greater than the number of unknowns (an overdetermined system). Conversely, any of those three cases may or may not be indeterminate.

Examples

The following examples of indeterminate systems of equations have respectively, fewer equations than, as many equations as, and more equations than unknowns:

Conditions giving rise to indeterminacy

In linear systems, indeterminacy occurs if and only if the number of independent equations (the rank of the augmented matrix of the system) is less than the number of unknowns and is the same as the rank of the coefficient matrix. For if there are at least as many independent equations as unknowns, that will eliminate any stretches of overlap of the equations' surfaces in the geometric space of the unknowns (aside from possibly a single point), which in turn excludes the possibility of having more than one solution. On the other hand, if the rank of the augmented matrix exceeds (necessarily by one, if at all) the rank of the coefficient matrix, then the equations will jointly contradict each other, which excludes the possibility of having any solution.

Finding the solution set of an indeterminate linear system

Let the system of equations be written in matrix form as 

In which case, if the system is indeterminate, then the infinite solution set is the set of all  vectors generated by

See also
Indeterminate equation
Indeterminate form
Indeterminate (variable)
Linear algebra
Simultaneous equations
Independent equation
Identifiability

References

Further reading

Linear algebra